Prunus species are used as food plants by the caterpillars of a number of Lepidoptera (butterflies and moths). These include:

Monophagous
Species which feed exclusively on Prunus

 Bucculatricidae
 Bucculatrix copeuta – only on pin cherry (P. pensylvanica)
 Coleophoridae
 Several Coleophora case-bearer species:
 C. adjectella – only on blackthorn (P. spinosa)
 C. amygdalina
 C. demissella – only on choke cherry (P. virginiana)
 C. lapidicornis
 C. prunifoliae – only on blackthorn (P. spinosa)
 C. umbratica
 Geometridae
 Rheumaptera prunivorata

Polyphagous
Species which feed on Prunus and other plants

 Arctiidae
 Hypercompe indecisa
 Bucculatricidae
 Bucculatrix pomifoliella
 Coleophoridae
 Several Coleophora case-bearer species:
 C. anatipennella – leaves – recorded on wild cherry (Prunus avium), blackthorn (Prunus spinosa), and possibly others
 C. atlantica
 C. atromarginata
 C. badiipennella – recorded on blackthorn (P. spinosa)
 C. cerasivorella
 C. coracipennella – recorded on sour cherry (Prunus cerasus), bird cherry (Prunus padus), blackthorn (P. spinosa) and others
 C. hemerobiella
 C. laticornella – recorded on wild plum (Prunus americana)
 C. lineapulvella
 C. malivorella
 C. nigricella
 C. paripennella
 C. pruniella
 C. sacramenta
 C. spinella (apple-and-plum case-bearer) – recorded on sour cherry (P. cerasus) and blackthorn (P. spinosa)
 Geometridae
Agriopis marginaria (dotted border)
 Campaea margaritata (light emerald)
 Chloroclysta truncata (common marbled carpet) – recorded on bird cherry (P. padus)
 Chloroclystis rectangulata (green pug) – recorded on cherry flowers
 Colotois pennaria (feathered thorn)
 Crocallis elinguaria (scalloped oak) – recorded on bird cherry (P. padus)
 Ectropis crepuscularia (engrailed)
 Epirrita autumnata (autumnal moth)
 Epirrita christyi (pale November moth)
 Epirrita dilutata (November moth)
 Erannis defoliaria (mottled umber)
 Eupithecia exiguata (mottled pug)
 Hemithea aestivaria (common emerald)
 Lomographa bimaculata (white-pinion spotted) – leaves – recorded on wild cherry (P. avium), blackthorn (P. spinosa), and possibly others
 Odontopera bidentata (scalloped hazel) – recorded on bird cherry (P. padus)
 Operophtera brumata (winter moth)
 Opisthograptis luteolata (brimstone moth)
 Peribatodes rhomboidaria (willow beauty) – leaves – recorded on blackthorn (P. spinosa) and possibly others
 Selenia tetralunaria (purple thorn)
 Lasiocampidae
 Malacosoma americanum (eastern tent caterpillar) – recorded on black cherry (Prunus serotina) and others
 Lymantriidae
 Euproctis chrysorrhoea (brown-tail)
 Euproctis similis (yellow-tail) – recorded on cherries
 Noctuidae
 Agrochola circellaris (brick) – recorded on bird cherry (P. padus)
 Acronicta psi (grey dagger)
 Acronicta tridens (dark dagger)
 Amphipyra tragopoginis (mouse moth)
 Cosmia trapezina (dun-bar)
 Eupsilia transversa (satellite)
 Melanchra persicariae (dot moth) – recorded on bird cherry (P. padus)
 Naenia typica (gothic)
 Noctua comes (lesser yellow underwing) – recorded on blackthorn (P. spinosa)
 Noctua janthina (lesser broad-bordered yellow underwing) – recorded on blackthorn (P. spinosa)
 Orthosia cerasi (common Quaker)
 Orthosia gothica (Hebrew character)
 Phlogophora meticulosa (angle shades)
 Xestia triangulum (double square-spot) – recorded on blackthorn (P. spinosa)
 Nolidae
 Nola cucullatella (short-cloaked moth)
 Notodontidae
 Nadata gibbosa (rough prominent)
 Phalera bucephala (buff-tip)
 Ptilodon capucina (coxcomb prominent) – recorded on bird cherry (P. padus)
 Nymphalidae
 Limenitis arthemis (American white admiral/red-spotted purple) – prefers choke cherry (Prunus virginiana) over pin cherry (Prunus pensylvanica) and black cherry (P. serotina)
 Oecophoridae
 Esperia oliviella – recorded in dead twigs of blackthorn (P. spinosa)
 Papilionidae
 Papilio glaucus (eastern tiger swallowtail) – recorded on cherries
 Papilio multicaudata (two-tailed swallowtail) – recorded on choke cherries
 Saturniidae
 Automeris io (Io moth) – recorded on pin cherry (P. pensylvanica)
 Callosamia promethea (promethea silkmoth)
 Hyalophora cecropia (cecropia moth)
 Pavonia pavonia (emperor moth)
 Sphingidae
 Ceratomia amyntor (elm sphinx) – recorded on cherries
 Mimas tiliae (lime hawk-moth)
 Smerinthus jamaicensis (twin-spotted sphinx) – recorded on peach (P. persica), plums and others
 Tortricidae
 Enarmonia formosana (cherrybark tortrix) – recorded on bark of cherries
 Epiphyas postvittana (light brown apple moth)
 Yponomeutidae
 Scythropia crataegella (hawthorn moth) – recorded on blackthorn (P. spinosa) and others

References

External links

Prunus
+Lepidoptera